Bahala Chennagide is a 2001 Indian Kannada language romantic comedy film starring Shiva Rajkumar, Shashi Kumar and Jaya Seal. The film is directed by M.S.Rajshekar. It is a remake of the Telugu language film Chala Bagundi (2000) directed by E. V. V. Satyanarayana.

Cast
 Shiva Rajkumar
 Shashi Kumar
 Jaya Seal
 Ruchita Prasad
 Ramesh Bhat
 Padma Vasanthi

Soundtrack
All the songs are composed and scored by Koti.

References

External links 

2001 films
2000s Kannada-language films
Kannada remakes of Telugu films
Indian romantic comedy films
Indian buddy comedy films
2000s buddy comedy films
Films scored by Koti
2001 romantic comedy films